Mundane History is a 2009 film by the Thai film-maker Anocha Suwichakornpong. She wrote, co-produced and directed the film. It is described as “one of the most startling and original feature debuts of recent years", and received its world premiere on 10 October 2009 at the 14th Busan International Film Festival in South Korea. It was the first Thai film to receive the country's most restrictive viewing rating, due to a scene of full-frontal male nudity and masturbation.

Mundane History won the Tiger Award at the 2010 International Film Festival Rotterdam.

Plot
Mundane History centres on the friendship that develops between a young paralysed man from a wealthy Bangkok family and his male nurse from Isan in the North of Thailand. The film is also a commentary on Thailand's class-based society and the frailty of life. It premiered at the 2009 Pusan International Film Festival, where it was in the New Currents competition and also opened the World Film Festival of Bangkok. It made its European Premiere in the Tiger Awards competition at the International Film Festival Rotterdam, and was among the three films in 15-title line-up that won the Tiger Award.

Main cast
Arkaney Cherkam as Pun
Paramej Noiam as Father
Anchana Ponpitakthepkijo as Somjai
Phakpoom Surapongsanuruk as Ake

Production
Made for $150,000, Mundane History was financed by the filmmaker's family and friends as well as grants and awards from the Hubert Bals Fund of the Rotterdam International Film Festival.

Rating
Featuring a scene of full-frontal male nudity and masturbation, it was the first Thai film under Thailand's motion-picture rating system to be given the most-restrictive 20+ rating.

See also
 List of Thai films
 Nudity in film (East Asian cinema since 1929)

References

External links

2009 drama films
2009 films
Thai drama films
Thai-language films